French invasion may refer to:
 :Category:Invasions by France
 :Category:Invasions of France

See also
 Invasion of Isle de France, 1810 British invasion of what is now called Mauritius
 Invasion of Southern France (disambiguation)